Pathfinder: Wrath of the Righteous is an isometric role-playing game developed by Cypriot studio of Russian origin Owlcat Games and published by META Publishing, based on Paizo Publishing's Pathfinder franchise. Announced through a Kickstarter campaign in February 2020, the game was released for Microsoft Windows and macOS on 2 September 2021. The game was released for PlayStation 4 and Xbox One on 29 September 2022 alongside a cloud-based version for Nintendo Switch.

Plot 
The country of Mendev has been fighting a series of wars against the Worldwound, a magical portal that allows demons to travel from their home in the Abyss to the mortal world. These wars, called crusades, have been slowly losing ground, primarily because demons killed in the mortal world return to life in the Abyss.

The player controls a citizen of the city of Kenabres, on Mendev's outskirts. After surviving a demonic invasion of the city, the player-character discovers that they have strange magical "mythic powers" from an unknown source. After driving the demons out of Kenabres, the player-character is appointed Commander of the Fifth Crusade by Queen Galfrey of Mendev.

The Commander deploys armies against the demonic forces while also trying to figure out how to close the Worldwound. They retake territory from the demons and recruit various individuals to their party. Their mythic powers grow, setting them onto one of several "mythic paths" such as becoming an angel, trickster or lich. The chosen mythic path significantly affects the Commander's abilities, leadership style, and personal fate.

The Commander discovers that their mythic powers come from an experiment conducted on them by Areelu Vorlesh, a half-demon mad scientist who created the Worldwound. Vorlesh attempted to place her murdered child's soul in the young Commander's body, but ended up creating the source of the mythic power. Vorlesh then erased the Commander's memory of her interference. The mythic source was activated by the stress of the attack on Kenabres and has been fuelled by the Commander's battles with powerful beings. After learning this, the Commander can choose to abandon their mythic powers, becoming a "Mortal Legend".

Vorlesh tells the Commander that the Worldwound is bound to her and the Commander's souls, and that one of them must die in the Worldwound for it to close. The Commander confronts her near the entrance to the Worldwound, where they fight. After Vorlesh is defeated, she attempts to commit suicide to spite the Commander, but can be talked down. The Commander can then choose to push Vorlesh into the Worldwound (if she is still alive), jump in themself, or use various other solutions based on their mythic path. If the Worldwound is closed, Mendev and the surrounding area are finally peaceful. However, some mythic paths can co-opt the Worldwound for their own purposes.

There is a secret ending that requires specific actions and research throughout the story. The Commander learns more about Vorlesh's experiments and realizes that she is trying to become a demigoddess. The Commander gathers the materials and knowledge necessary for the ascension and finally completes it after defeating Vorlesh, gaining more power and near-immortality. They can choose to do it alone, or let Vorlesh and/or their party members also become demigods.

Development 
The game is a sequel to Pathfinder: Kingmaker, the previous role-playing game of the same developer, but it does not follow the same story. The sequel builds on the engine from Kingmaker to address concerns raised by critics and players, and expands additional rulesets from the tabletop game, includes new character classes and the mythic progression system. Owlcat launched a Kickstarter campaign in February 2020 to raise additional development funds for the title. Like its predecessor, Wrath of the Righteous follows an Adventure Path of the same name, which was originally published in August 2013.

Downloadable content 
Three major pieces of downloadable content have been released for Pathfinder: Wrath of the Righteous. The first DLC, Inevitable Excess, was released on 3 March 2022. In it, the Commander is trapped in another dimension by a "keeper of magic" who believes their mythic powers violate the laws of the universe. The second DLC, Through the Ashes, was released on 21 April 2022. This story follows a group of ordinary people trying to survive the demonic attack on Kenabres. The third DLC, The Treasure of the Midnight Isles, was released on 30 August 2022. It is a rogue-lite campaign where the party searches for a mysterious treasure in the Abyss. The first and third DLCs can be played on their own or incorporated into the main campaign, while the second can only be played standalone.

Reception 

Pathfinder: Wrath of the Righteous received "generally favorable" reviews according to review aggregator Metacritic. Writing for IGN, Rowan Kaiser praised the game's story and technical improvements over its predecessor, but expressed disappointment with the military management aspects. Jody Macgregor of PC Gamer proclaimed the game is "well worth your time", but criticized its inconsistent writing quality.

By January 2023, the game had sold one million copies worldwide.

References

External links 
 

2021 video games
Crowdfunded video games
Deep Silver games
Fantasy video games
Kickstarter-funded video games
MacOS games
Pathfinder
Role-playing video games
Single-player video games
Video games based on tabletop role-playing games
Video games developed in Russia
Video games featuring protagonists of selectable gender
Video games with isometric graphics
Windows games
PlayStation 4 games
Xbox One games